Gallant Lake (also known as Mud Lake, Gallant Pond or Mud Pond) is a natural freshwater lake in Tuscaloosa County, Alabama. The eastern tip of Gallant Lake borders the right of way of Interstate 20.

References

Lakes of Alabama
Lakes of Tuscaloosa County, Alabama